Mamuna may refer to:

A Slavic demoness, one of the Slavic fairies
Mammon (mamona), a goddess of wealth